Kobylnica  (formerly , or Königlich Kublitz) is a village in Słupsk County, Pomeranian Voivodeship, in northern Poland. It is the seat of the gmina (administrative district) called Gmina Kobylnica.

Before 1648 the area was part of Duchy of Pomerania, 1648-1945 Prussia and Germany. For the history of the region, see History of Pomerania.

The village has a population of 2,248.

See also
 The HVDC Swepol, Bruskowo Wielkie Static Inverter Plant Power station lies approximately 15 km from Kobylnica.

References

Kobylnica

fr:Kobylnica
it:Kobylnica